Mária Janák (born 8 February 1958 in Baja, Bács-Kiskun) is a former javelin thrower from Hungary, who set her personal best in 1982, throwing 62.10 metres. She competed for her native country at the 1980 Summer Olympics in Moscow, USSR, finishing in 13th place (57.80 metres) in the overall-rankings.

References

1958 births
Living people
Hungarian female javelin throwers
Athletes (track and field) at the 1980 Summer Olympics
Olympic athletes of Hungary
People from Baja, Hungary
Sportspeople from Bács-Kiskun County